Halmstad Airport , also known as Halmstad City Airport, is an airport situated  northwest of Halmstad, a city in the Halmstad Municipality of Halland County, Sweden. The airport has been managed by Halmstad Municipality since 2006.

Halmstad Airport served as an airforce base (F14) between 1944 and 1961. The airport is still supporting the military operations located in Halmstad. 800 to 1300 aircraft movements per year are military related.

Facilities

Airlines and destinations

Statistics

See also
List of the largest airports in the Nordic countries

References

External links
 HalmstadsFlygplats.se
 
 

Airports in Sweden
Halmstad
Buildings and structures in Halland County
International airports in Sweden